The 5th Military District was an administrative district of the Australian Army. Formed shortly after the Federation of Australia, the 5th Military District covered all of Western Australia except the Kimberley region, with its headquarters at Swan Barracks in Perth. Following the First World War, the area's designation was changed to the 5th District Base. In October 1939, it was re-designated as Western Command when the Army moved towards a geographic command structure. In April 1942, the Army was reorganised and Western Command became III Corps in April 1942.

Western Command was re-formed in June 1944 when the need for a corps-level headquarters passed. 

Then-Captain William Henderson, later promoted to Major General, served on the command's staff soon after the Second World War ended. The 13th Infantry Brigade was re-raised in 1948, once again headquartered in Western Australia, and assigned to Western Command. Upon formation, it consisted of two infantry battalions: the 11th/44th and the 16th/28th. In 1960, when the CMF was reorganised following the adoption of the Pentropic divisional establishment, the brigade was disbanded.

The geographical command structure was retained until the 1970s.

Citations

References

 
 
 

History of Western Australia
Military districts of Australia